Stream TV was an Italian digital satellite television pay TV company launched in 1993 and closed in 2003, due to the merge with TELE+ into Sky Italia.

History 
Stream S.P.A. was the service provider, a television company owned by STET. It was founded in 1993 by Miro Allione, a STET managing director. Stream TV started broadcasting as a digital pay TV company and later included satellite television. The company had conflicts with TELE+ for several years, especially for the broadcasting rights of Italian football league Serie A. In 1999 part of the company was sold by Telecom Italia to News Corporation. In March 2003 TELE+ and Stream merged into Sky Italia.

References 

Sky Italia
Italian-language television networks
Television channels and stations established in 1993
Direct broadcast satellite services